Arnica lanceolata is a North American species of flowering plant in the family Asteraceae, known by the common name clasping arnica or lanceleaf arnica. It has a disjunct (discontinuous) distribution in western North America and northeastern North America.

Arnica lanceolata is a perennial herb usually growing from a small rhizome and producing one or more hairy, glandular stems. The stems are lined with 5 to 10 pairs of oval-shaped, toothed leaves up to 12 centimeters long. The inflorescence is a cluster of several daisy-like flower heads with a center of brownish disc florets and a fringe of yellow ray florets 1 to 2 centimeters long. The fruit is a cylindrical achene covered in hairs and with a light brown pappus at one end. It grows in moist areas, along stream banks, and montane to alpine meadows.

Subspecies
 Arnica lanceolata subsp. lanceolata - Quebec, New Brunswick, Maine, New Hampshire, Vermont, New York
 Arnica lanceolata subsp. prima (Maguire) Strother & S.J.Wolf - Alaska, Yukon, Northwest Territories, Alberta, British Columbia, Washington, Oregon, California, Idaho, Montana, Utah, Wyoming, Nevada

References

External links
Go Botany, New England Wildflower Society
Maine Department of Agriculture, Conservation and Forestry, Maine Natural Areas Program, Arnica lanceolata Nutt., Flower of Hairy Arnica description and ecological information with photos

lanceolata
Flora of Subarctic America
Plants described in 1841
Flora of the Northwestern United States
Flora of the Southwestern United States
Flora of the Northeastern United States
Flora of Eastern Canada
Flora without expected TNC conservation status